The white-eared monarch (Carterornis leucotis), or white-eared flycatcher, is a species of bird in the family Monarchidae.
It is endemic to north-eastern Australia. Its natural habitat is subtropical or tropical moist lowland forests. The white-eared monarch was originally described in the genus Monarcha until moved to Carterornis in 2009.

Gallery

References

white-eared monarch
Birds of Queensland
Endemic birds of Australia
white-eared monarch
Articles containing video clips
Taxonomy articles created by Polbot